Max Marinko (1916–1975) was a Yugoslav and Czechoslovak international table tennis player.

Table tennis career
Marinko won a silver medal at the 1939 World Table Tennis Championships in the men's team event for Yugoslavia. After World War II, he switched allegiance to Czechoslovakia and went on to win three more medals, two of which were gold, in the team event.

See also
 List of table tennis players
 List of World Table Tennis Championships medalists

References

Yugoslav table tennis players
Czechoslovak male table tennis players
Yugoslav emigrants to Czechoslovakia
Czechoslovak emigrants to Canada
Canadian male table tennis players
Sportspeople from Ljubljana
1916 births
1975 deaths
World Table Tennis Championships medalists